Elizabeth Valerie Hume (born 29 October 1956) is a Canadian phonologist.

Education and career 
Hume received her Ph.D. from Cornell University in 1992, under the supervision of G. N. Clements. She was a Professor of Linguistics at the Ohio State University from 1992 to 2011. From 2006 to 2011, she served as professor and chair of the Department of Linguistics. From 2011 to 2017, she was a Professor of Linguistics at University of Canterbury in New Zealand. She returned to Ohio State to serve as Vice Provost and Dean of Undergraduate Education on October 1, 2017.

She was an associate editor of Phonology for many years beginning in 2008.

Her fields of research are sound systems of human language, factors influencing language variation and change, and the role of information and predictability in shaping language systems.

Honors 

In 2022, Hume was inducted as a Fellow of the Linguistic Society of America.

Works 
Goldsmith, John, Elizabeth Hume and Leo Wetzels, eds. 2011. Tones and Features. Phonetic and Phonological Perspectives. Mouton de Gruyter.
Hume, Elizabeth. 2004. The indeterminacy/attestation model of metathesis. Language 80(2).

References

External links
Elizabeth V. Hume at the University of Canterbury

Cornell University alumni
Ohio State University faculty
Academic staff of the University of Canterbury
Linguists
French-language education
Phonologists
1956 births
Living people
Women linguists
Fellows of the Linguistic Society of America